Thomas or Tom Luce may refer to: 

Thomas Luce (MP) (1790–1875), British politician
Captain Thomas Luce (1827–1911), American whaling captain, and founder of Thomas Luce & Company
Thomas W. Luce, III, founding CEO and former chairman of the board of the National Math and Science Initiative and former Assistant Secretary of the U.S. Department of Education
Tom Luce, American musician and namesake of the California rock band Luce (band)

See also
Tom Luse, American film producer